The 1980 World Championship Tennis Finals was a men's tennis tournament played on indoor carpet courts. It was the 10th edition of the WCT Finals and was part of the 1980 Volvo Grand Prix. It was played at the Reunion Arena in Dallas, Texas in the United States and was held from April 28 through May 4, 1980.

Final

Singles

 Jimmy Connors defeated  John McEnroe 2–6, 7–6, 6–1, 6–2
 It was Connors' 3rd title of the year and the 94th of his career.

See also
 Connors–McEnroe rivalry

References

External links
 ITF tournament edition details